The 2010 12BET.com UK Championship was a professional ranking snooker tournament that took place between 4–12 December 2010 at the Telford International Centre in Telford, England.

Ding Junhui was the defending champion, but he lost 8–9 against Mark Allen in the last 16.

John Higgins won the title after defeating Mark Williams in the final frame of the final to clinch his third UK title. Higgins had trailed 5–9 and required a snooker in the seventeenth frame to remain in the match. With this win he regained the number one position in the rankings.

Prize fund
The breakdown of prize money for this year is shown below:

Winner: £100,000
Runner-up: £46,000
Semi-finals: £23,250
Quarter-finals: £16,450
Last 16: £12,050
Last 32: £8,750
Last 48: £5,500
Last 64: £2,300

Stage one highest break: £500
Stage two highest break: £5,000
Total: £625,000

Main draw

Final

Qualifying
These matches were held between 23 November and 1 December 2010 at the World Snooker Academy, Sheffield, England.

Century breaks

Televised stage centuries

 143, 109, 103, 100  Mark Joyce
 142, 106  Stuart Bingham
 142  Jamie Cope
 141, 130, 114, 113, 100  Mark Allen
 138, 100  Marco Fu
 137, 137, 135, 134, 127, 122, 106  Stephen Maguire
 137, 137  Stephen Lee
 137, 136, 126, 125, 120, 113, 105  Neil Robertson
 135, 131, 103, 101  Ding Junhui
 135  Judd Trump
 131, 129, 107, 101, 100  Shaun Murphy
 131  Patrick Wallace

 126  Tom Ford
 125  Mark Davis
 120, 104  Ken Doherty
 115  Jimmy White
 113  Peter Ebdon
 110, 107  Andrew Higginson
 109  Mark Selby
 105, 105, 100, 100  John Higgins
 104  Stephen Hendry
 103  Matthew Stevens
 100  Graeme Dott

References

2010
UK Championship
UK Championship
UK Championship